"I Want You So Bad" is a rhythm and blues song written and recorded by James Brown. Released as a single in 1959, it charted #20 R&B. It was Brown's third R&B hit and his first that did not feature vocal backing from The Famous Flames, although they received credit on the label.

References

James Brown songs
Songs written by James Brown
1959 singles
1959 songs
Federal Records singles